Yvonne O'Byrne (born 2 January 1992) is an Ireland women's field hockey international. She was a member of the Ireland team that played in the 2018 Women's Hockey World Cup final. She plays for Cork Harlequins in the Women's Irish Hockey League and has also played for Cork Institute of Technology at intervarsity level.

Early years, family and education
O'Byrne is the daughter of Pat O'Byrne. She has two brothers, Niall and Lorcan. She was raised in the  Model Farm Road and Bishopstown districts of Cork. She was educated at St Catherine's N.S., Mount Mercy College, Cork and the Cork Institute of Technology. In addition to playing field hockey, in her youth O'Byrne also played association football with Wilton United.

Domestic teams

Mount Mercy College
O'Byrne began playing field hockey while attending Mount Mercy College, Cork. In 2006, aged just 14 and while still a second year student, O'Byrne was the youngest member of the Mount Mercy team that won the Munster Senior Schools Cup and the Kate Russell All-Ireland Schoolgirls Championships. O'Byrne captained the Mount Mercy team in 2010. O'Byrne would later return to Mount Mercy to coach the field hockey team.

Munster
Between 2006 and 2013 O'Byrne represented and captained Munster at Under-16, Under-18 and Under-21 levels. She played with the Munster senior team in 2011 when they won the Senior Interprovincial tournament. She was named Munster Under-18 Player of the Year in 2010 and Munster Under-21 Player of the Year in 2012.

Cork Harlequins
In 2008 O'Byrne began playing for Cork Harlequins. She was encouraged to play for the club by Cliodhna Sargent, an Ireland women's field hockey international and former Mount Mercy student. At the time Sargent was playing for Harlequins and coaching Mount Mercy.  O'Byrne began captaining the team aged just 19. She subsequently helped Cork Harlequins win the Munster Senior League Division 1 titles in 2008, 2009, 2010 and 2013. She also helped the club finish as runners up in the 2009–10 Women's Irish Hockey League. In the 2016–17 season she was captain of the Cork Harlequins team that played in the Irish Senior Cup final. Other members of the team included Roisin Upton and Naomi Carroll. She was again captain when Harlequins finished as runners up in both the Women's Irish Hockey League and the EY Champions Trophy in 2017–18.

Cork Institute of Technology
O'Byrne has been a bursary student at Cork Institute of Technology since 2010. She completed a Bachelor of Business in Recreation and Leisure in May 2013. She than began an Honours Business degree in Sport and Exercise. In August 2018, she was completing a research PhD in health promotion intervention in primary schools. She has captained the CIT ladies field hockey team in the intervarsity tournament, the Chilean Cup. In 2012 she captained CIT as they won the Chilean Plate.

Ireland international
O'Byrne represented Ireland at Under-18, Under-21 and Ireland A level before making her senior debut  against Spain in January 2014. O'Byrne was a member of the Ireland team that won the 2015 Women's EuroHockey Championship II, defeating the Czech Republic 5–0 in the final. In January 2017 she was also a member of the Ireland team that won a 2016–17 Women's FIH Hockey World League Round 2 tournament in Kuala Lumpur, defeating Malaysia 3–0 in the final.

O'Byrne represented Ireland at the 2018 Women's Hockey World Cup and was a prominent member of the team that won the silver medal. She featured in all of Ireland's games throughout the tournament, including the pool games against the United States, India, and England, the quarter-final against India, the semi-final against Spain and the final against the Netherlands.

Honours
Ireland
Women's Hockey World Cup
Runners Up: 2018
Women's FIH Hockey World League
Winners: 2017 Kuala Lumpur
Women's EuroHockey Championship II
Winners: 2015
Women's Hockey Champions Challenge I
Runners Up: 2014
Women's Four Nations Cup
Runners Up: 2017
Cork Harlequins
Munster Senior League Division 1
Winners: 2008, 2009, 2010, 2013
Women's Irish Hockey League
Runners Up: 2009–10, 2017–18
Irish Senior Cup
Runners Up: 2016–17
EY Champions Trophy
Runners Up: 2018
Cork Institute of Technology
Chilean Plate
Winners: 2012
Mount Mercy College, Cork
Kate Russell All-Ireland Schoolgirls Championships
Winners: 2006
Munster Senior Schools Cup
Winners: 2006

References

1992 births
Living people
Ireland international women's field hockey players
Irish female field hockey players
Female field hockey defenders
Alumni of Cork Institute of Technology
Sportspeople from Cork (city)
Women's Irish Hockey League players